Then Came the Woman is a 1926 American silent drama film directed by David Hartford and starring Frank Mayo, Cullen Landis and Mildred Ryan.

Cast
 Frank Mayo as John Hobart 
 Cullen Landis as Bob Morris 
 Mildred Ryan as Mary 
 Blanche Craig as Mrs. McCann 
 Tom Maguire as Mr. McCann

References

Bibliography
 Munden, Kenneth White. The American Film Institute Catalog of Motion Pictures Produced in the United States, Part 1. University of California Press, 1997.

External links

1926 films
1926 romantic drama films
American romantic drama films
Films directed by David Hartford
American silent feature films
American black-and-white films
1920s English-language films
1920s American films
Silent romantic drama films
Silent American drama films